Kuthannur-II is a village in Palakkad district in the state of Kerala, India.

Demographics
 India census, Kuthannur-II had a population of 6,363 with 3,042 males and 3,321 females.

References

Villages in Palakkad district